

Works

Births
 Sturla Þórðarson (died 1284), Icelandic politician/chieftain and writer; author of Íslendinga saga

Deaths

See also

 Poetry
 List of years in poetry

13th-century poetry
Poetry